Charles G. Thomas (August 21, 1835 in Bedford, Ohio – December 24, 1916) was a member of the Wisconsin State Assembly during the 1883 and 1885 sessions. A Republican, he represented Richland County, Wisconsin. He was born on August 21, 1835, in Bedford, Ohio.

References

People from Bedford, Ohio
People from Richland County, Wisconsin
Republican Party members of the Wisconsin State Assembly
1835 births
1916 deaths